William Davis Shipman (December 29, 1818 – September 24, 1898) was a United States district judge of the United States District Court for the District of Connecticut. He notably presided over the 1861 trial of Nathaniel Gordon, the only person to be convicted and executed in the United States for illegal slave smuggling.

Education and career
Born in Chester, Connecticut, Shipman read law to enter the bar in 1849 and entered private practice in East Haddam, Connecticut. He was a probate judge in Hartford, Connecticut from 1852 to 1853, a member of the Connecticut House of Representatives in 1853, and the United States Attorney for the District of Connecticut from 1853 to 1860.

Federal judicial service
Shipman was nominated by President James Buchanan on February 28, 1860, to a seat on the United States District Court for the District of Connecticut vacated by Judge Charles A. Ingersoll. He was confirmed by the United States Senate on March 12, 1860, and received his commission the same day. His service terminated on April 16, 1873, due to his resignation.

United States v. Nathaniel Gordon
Among the notable cases over which Shipman presided, was the case of the United States v. Nathaniel Gordon. The case resulted in Gordon's execution, which is the only such execution ever under the Piracy Law of 1820. In sentencing Gordon, Shipman said:

Later career and death
Following his resignation from the federal bench, Shipman resumed private practice in New York City until his death on September 24, 1898 in the Astoria neighborhood in Queens, New York City.

References

Sources
 

1818 births
1898 deaths
Judges of the United States District Court for the District of Connecticut
United States federal judges appointed by James Buchanan
19th-century American judges
Probate court judges in the United States
People from Chester, Connecticut
Members of the Connecticut House of Representatives
Connecticut state court judges
Connecticut lawyers
Lawyers from New York City
United States federal judges admitted to the practice of law by reading law
19th-century American politicians